The 2018 French Open (officially known as the Yonex French Open 2018 for sponsorship reasons) was a badminton tournament which took place at Stade Pierre de Coubertin in Paris, France, from 23 to 28 October 2018 and had a total prize of $750,000.

Tournament
The 2018 French Open is the twenty-first tournament of the 2018 BWF World Tour and also part of the French Open championships, which had been held since 1909. This tournament is organized by French Badminton Federation and sanctioned by the BWF.

Venue
This international tournament was held at Stade Pierre de Coubertin in Paris, France.

Point distribution
Below is the point distribution table for each phase of the tournament based on the BWF points system for the BWF World Tour Super 750 event.

Prize money
The total prize money for this year's tournament was US$750,000. Distribution of prize money was in accordance with BWF regulations.

Men's singles

Seeds

 Kento Momota (semi-finals)
 Shi Yuqi (final)
 Viktor Axelsen (withdrew)
 Chou Tien-chen (first round)
 Srikanth Kidambi (quarter-finals)
 Chen Long (champion)
 Son Wan-ho (quarter-finals)
 Anthony Sinisuka Ginting (first round)

Finals

Top half

Section 1

Section 2

Bottom half

Section 3

Section 4

Women's singles

Seeds

 Tai Tzu-ying (final)
 Akane Yamaguchi (champion) 
 P. V. Sindhu (quarter-finals)
 Chen Yufei (semi-finals)
 Carolina Marín (withdrew) 
 Ratchanok Intanon (quarter-finals)
 He Bingjiao (semi-finals)
 Nozomi Okuhara (second round)

Finals

Top half

Section 1

Section 2

Bottom half

Section 3

Section 4

Men's doubles

Seeds

 Marcus Fernaldi Gideon / Kevin Sanjaya Sukamuljo (final)
 Li Junhui / Liu Yuchen (second round)
 Liu Cheng / Zhang Nan (second round)
 Takeshi Kamura / Keigo Sonoda (first round)
 Kim Astrup / Anders Skaarup Rasmussen (first round)
 Mads Conrad-Petersen / Mads Pieler Kolding (withdrew) 
 Chen Hung-ling / Wang Chi-lin (quarter-finals)
 Fajar Alfian / Muhammad Rian Ardianto (withdrew)

Finals

Top half

Section 1

Section 2

Bottom half

Section 3

Section 4

Women's doubles

Seeds

 Yuki Fukushima / Sayaka Hirota (second round)
 Misaki Matsutomo / Ayaka Takahashi (quarter-finals)
 Chen Qingchen / Jia Yifan (first round)
 Greysia Polii / Apriyani Rahayu (semi-finals)
 Mayu Matsumoto / Wakana Nagahara (champions)
 Shiho Tanaka / Koharu Yonemoto (second round)
 Lee So-hee / Shin Seung-chan (semi-finals)
 Jongkolphan Kititharakul / Rawinda Prajongjai (first round)

Finals

Top half

Section 1

Section 2

Bottom half

Section 3

Section 4

Mixed doubles

Seeds

 Zheng Siwei / Huang Yaqiong (champions)
 Wang Yilü / Huang Dongping (quarter-finals)
 Tontowi Ahmad / Liliyana Natsir (quarter-finals)
 Tang Chun Man / Tse Ying Suet (second round)
 Zhang Nan / Li Yinhui (first round)
 Mathias Christiansen / Christinna Pedersen (first round)
 Chan Peng Soon / Goh Liu Ying (first round)
 Goh Soon Huat / Shevon Jemie Lai (second round)

Finals

Top half

Section 1

Section 2

Bottom half

Section 3

Section 4

References

External links
 Tournament Link

French Open (badminton)
French Open (badminton)
French Open (badminton)
French Open (badminton)